Xbox 360 applications are non-game software applications designed to run on the Xbox 360 platform. Xbox 360 applications can either be stored on the console's hard disk drive or on a USB flash drive. Often, an Xbox Live Gold membership is also required to access some applications, as well as subscriptions correspondent to the applications. Some of these applications are country specific.
Note, this list is dated and a large majority of the apps can no longer can be downloaded, or no longer function on the console, as of July 2022.

List

See also

 List of Xbox One applications
 List of Xbox 360 games
 Xbox Live Event Player

Notes

References

External links
 Xbox 360 Apps

Applications
Applications Xbox 360